The Shire of Chapman Valley is a local government area located in the Mid West region of Western Australia, immediately northeast of the City of Geraldton and about  north of Perth, the state capital.

History

The Upper Chapman Road District was established on 25 January 1901. On 28 March 1958, it was renamed to Chapman Valley Road District and on 1 July 1961, it became a Shire under the Local Government Act 1960, which reformed all remaining road districts into shires.

Wards
The Shire no longer has wards - represented by 8 councillors

Towns and localities
The towns and localities of the Shire of Chapman Valley with population and size figures based on the most recent Australian census:

(* indicates locality is only partially located within this shire)

  For the purpose of the 2021 Australian census, Hickety was counted as part of Dindiloa.
  For the purpose of the 2021 Australian census,Valentine was counted as part of North Eradu.

Population

Heritage-listed places

As of 2023, 97 places are heritage-listed in the Shire of Chapman Valley, of which eight are on the State Register of Heritage Places.

References

External links
 

Chapman Valley